is a fictional character in the Mother role-playing video games published by Nintendo, created by Japanese video game designer Shigesato Itoi. His first appearance was in the 1994 Super NES game EarthBound (known as Mother 2 in Japan), the second entry from the series, in which he serves as the game's main protagonist and playable character. He also appears as a playable fighter in the Super Smash Bros. series of fighting games where he is voiced by Makiko Ohmoto.

Ness is depicted as a thirteen-year-old boy residing in the fictional town of Onett in Eagleland who has psychic abilities referred to as PSI. In EarthBound, Ness teams up with several other characters to battle Giygas, the main antagonist of the game and a recurring character in the series.

Conception and creation
Ness is the protagonist of EarthBound, the second game in the three-part Mother series. Upon lackluster sales in North America, EarthBound became the first game in the series at the time to receive an English-language release, and, subsequently, became a cult classic. The game presents a humorous parody of American culture and the role-playing video game genre.

Ness was created by Shigesato Itoi, the creator of the EarthBound series, who intended the character to be like an actual person: "I wanted to create a game (EarthBound) with real characters; characters whom players would recognize in the people around them." Ness's name is a reference to "NES", the abbreviation for the Nintendo Entertainment System. In EarthBound, the player is able to rename all playable characters including Ness before beginning the game's story. Itoi has stated that by doing so, it allows the players themselves to decide if Ness is the same character as Ninten, the main character of Mother, the previous game in the series. Ness's favorite food and favorite thing are also decided by the player, although by default, his favorite thing is "Rockin", and his favorite food is "Steak". In the Japanese release of EarthBound, players could choose other default names for Ness, one of which was John (in reference to The Beatles John Lennon). Players could also choose Honey Pie as their favourite food and LOVE as their favourite thing (in reference to The Beatles songs "Honey Pie" and "All You Need Is Love"). Players could also choose the default name Mario, based on the Mario series' character of the same name.

Appearances

EarthBound
Ness appears in EarthBound as the main playable protagonist, living in the town Onett in Eagleland. Ness possesses extremely powerful PSI abilities latent from birth that develop as the game progresses. Ness primarily utilizes baseball bats as offensive weapons against enemies. At the beginning of the game's story, a meteorite crash-lands near Ness's house. Upon inspecting the crash site Ness meets a time-traveling alien called Buzz-Buzz, who states that Ness is the "chosen one" that can defeat the entity named Giygas, who in the near future destroys the universe. In order to prepare for the battle against Giygas, Buzz-Buzz instructs Ness to travel to eight sanctuaries in different areas of Eagleland, where he can absorb their psychic energies in order to unite his power with that of the Earth. During his journey, Ness teams up with Paula and Poo, who also possess PSI, and Jeff, a boy-genius. Ness's next-door neighbor Pokey Minch (named "Porky Minch" in Mother 3), however, allies with Giygas and antagonizes Ness throughout the game.

After Ness, Paula, Jeff, and Poo visit all eight sanctuaries, Ness falls unconscious and enters Magicant, a realm within his mind. There, Ness vanquishes a personification of his evil thoughts. Ness's mind then clears, causing his psychic powers to unite with each of the eight sanctuaries and greatly expand. Ness, now fueled with unlimited power, awakens, after which the four characters learn that to battle Giygas they must time travel to the past. The four-time travel to the past using a time machine built by Jeff's father Doctor Andonuts, where they confront Giygas and Pokey. Giygas is defeated but Pokey flees. The four characters return to the present, and the game ends with Ness returning home.

Mother 3 
Ness appears in Mother 3 in a movie playing in the New Pork City movie theater. The movie shows shots of many moments in EarthBound, such as meeting Master Belch, meeting Dungeon Man and approaching the meteorite in Onett to get Zexonyte. In the same movie theater, a you can buy a fake bat that looks like the one Ness uses in Super Smash Bros. series. Also purchasable is a red hat that looks like Ness's.

Super Smash Bros. series 

Ness appears as a playable fighter in the Super Smash Bros. series.  Though EarthBound sold poorly in the United States, Ness became popular through his addition to the Super Smash Bros. fighting game series roster, where he appeared in all five games: the original Super Smash Bros. and its sequels Melee, Brawl, 3DS/Wii U, and Ultimate.

In these games, Ness possesses PSI attacks used by Paula and Poo in EarthBound. The character Mr. Saturn appears in Super Smash Bros. Melee, which could be thrown at enemies and otherwise pushes items off the battlefield. The description of a collectible trophy depicting Paula states that she had taught her attack techniques to Ness, including the PSI attacks known as "PK Thunder" and "PK Fire". He can also use a PK Flash, a move that he uses in EarthBound. He was originally going to be replaced by Lucas, the main protagonist of EarthBounds sequel Mother 3, in Melee but was brought back after Mother 3s Nintendo 64 release was ultimately cancelled. Ness returned in Super Smash Bros. Brawl, along with items, characters, settings, and villains from Mother 3, along with a new move as his version of the new "Final Smash" move (Poo's "PK Starstorm"). Ness returned again in Super Smash Bros. for Nintendo 3DS and Wii U and Super Smash Bros. Ultimate.

Reception
IGN called Ness "one of the biggest surprise additions to the original Super Smash Bros. lineup". He was voted by fans as the second favorite character in that game. Fans of Ness were anticipating a reveal of Ness for Super Smash Bros. Brawl; the reveal of Lucas as well as the similarities between their moves in the Super Smash Bros. series, however, caused fans to worry. IGN expected that Ness would be cut from Brawl as a result of Lucas' inclusion. Thomas East from Official Nintendo Magazine ranked him eighth on his list of "Smash Bros characters who need to be dropped for Wii U and 3DS", explaining "Ness was considered to be an obscure choice back in 1999, it is perhaps more of a surprise that he is still hanging around". Russ Frushtick of UGO Networks stated that Ness was cool because "Ness' childlike appearance belies his potent psychic abilities". The same site later placed Ness' baseball cap on the ninth spot on its "Top 30" list of "The Coolest Helmets and Headgear in Video Games", and also ranked him as the 45th best kid in video games in their "Top 50", with the writer Marissa Meli saying "he is the best RPG star of all time". He was named as the 17th best Nintendo character of all time by GameDaily. A fan animator also made a Super Smash Bros mini series about Ness story campaign.

Ness was among the biggest surprise inclusions in the original 1999 Super Smash Bros., which gave Mother series fans "hope for the future"., and he has become better known for his appearances in the series than for original game. His spot in the game was actually intended for Mother 3 protagonist Lucas, but the developers later fit Ness into the character design when Mother 3 was delayed. In the original game, some characters had move sets imported from their own games, while move sets for characters like Ness had to be invented. Ness was a hidden character and had odd controls, but IGN wrote that he was "one of the most powerful characters" when players perfected his psychic power move set. In Europe, which did not see an EarthBound release, Ness was better known for his role in the fighting game than for his original role in the role-playing game. Thomas East of the Official Nintendo Magazine blog suggested in 2012 that Ness should be removed from future versions of the fighting game due to his lack of popularity. Ness was praised and ranked as 14th most overpowered character in Super Smash Bros Ultimate by Polygon, stating that "a schoolboy armed with a baseball bat might seem profoundly out of his depth in an over-the-top fracas like Smash Bros., but Ness also brings phenomenal psychic powers to the fight", while Gavin Jasper of Den of Geek ranked Ness as 63rd of Super Smash Bros. Ultimate characters, criticizing his abilities. Cale Michael of Dot Esports notes that some players who use Ness in online matches of the game take advantage of poor internet connectivity and spam projectile moves and heavy hitting moves at the opponent.

A variety of merchandise depicting Ness have been produced by Nintendo; this merchandise includes a figurine and an Amiibo.

Notes

References

 

Child characters in video games
Child superheroes
Male characters in video games
Nintendo protagonists
Nintendo characters
Mother (video game series)
Silent protagonists
Super Smash Bros. fighters
Telepath characters in video games
Video game characters introduced in 1994
Video game characters who can move at superhuman speeds
Video game characters who use magic
Video game characters who can teleport
Fictional clubfighters
Fictional psychics